Natasa Theodoridou (Greek: Νατάσα Θεοδωρίδου) is the self-titled debut album by Greek singer Natasa Theodoridou. It was released on 3 October 1997 by Sony Music Greece and received platinum certification in Greece, selling 50,000 units. A majority of songs were composed by Triantaphillos in collaboration with Phoebus. It contains seven singles, including "Dihos Logo Ki Aformi", "Ena Spiti Kaigetai", "Mi Giriseis Xana" and "Ah! Kai Na 'Tane".

Track listing

Credits 
Credits adapted from the album's liner notes.

Personnel 
Hakan Bingolou: percussion (tracks: 1, 2, 3, 4, 6, 8, 10, 11, 12) || säz (tracks: 12)
Giannis Bithikotsis: baglama (tracks: 5, 7, 9, 13) || bouzouki (tracks: 2, 5, 6, 7, 8, 9, 13) || cura (tracks: 1, 3, 4, 10) || mandolin (tracks: 11)
Charis Chalkitis: backing vocals (tracks: 1, 2, 3, 4, 6, 7, 8, 9, 10, 12)
Nikos Chatzopoulos: violin (tracks: 4, 8)
Antonis Gounaris: cümbüş (tracks: 2, 3, 10) || guitar, orchestration, programming (all tracks)
Paola Komini: backing vocals (tracks: 1, 2, 3, 4, 6, 7, 8, 9, 10, 12)
Fedon Lionoudakis: accordion (tracks: 1, 6, 9)
Elena Patroklou: backing vocals (tracks: 1, 2, 3, 4, 6, 7, 8, 9, 10, 12)
Thanasis Vasilopoulos: clarinet (tracks: 11) || ney (tracks: 12)

Production 
Takis Argiriou (111 studio): mix engineer, sound engineer
Giannis Doulamis: executive producer
Antonis Glikos: artwork
Giannis Ioannidis (D.P.H.): mastering
Dimitris Kilalous: photographer

References

Natasa Theodoridou albums
Greek-language albums
1997 albums
Sony Music Greece albums